The 1985 Boston University Terriers football team was an American football team that represented Boston University as a member of the Yankee Conference during the 1985 NCAA Division I-AA football season. In their first season under head coach Steve Stetson, the Terriers compiled a 3–8 record (1–4 against conference opponents), tied for last place in the Yankee Conference, and were outscored by a total of 265 to 172.

Schedule

References

Boston University
Boston University Terriers football seasons
Boston University Terriers football